Dylan Jazz is an instrumental jazz album of Bob Dylan songs featuring Glen Campbell on guitar and Jim Horn on saxophone and flute, released in 1965.

Track listing
All songs written by Bob Dylan

Side one
"Blowin' in the Wind" – 2:51
"Masters of War" – 3:01
"Mr. Tambourine Man" – 3:11
"Don't Think Twice" – 2:47
"Walkin' Down the Line" – 2:32

Side two
"All I Really Want to Do" – 2:23
"Like A Rolling Stone" – 2:38
"A Hard Rain's A Gonna Fall – 2:34
"Subterranean Homesick Blues" – 2:21
"It Ain't Me Babe" – 2:39

Personnel
Jim Horn - saxophone, flute
Glen Campbell - guitar
Al De Lory - piano
Lyle Ritz - bass
Hal Blaine - drums

Production
Producer - Leon Russell, Snuff Garrett
Executive producer - Bud Dain
Album design - Peter Whorf Graphics

Release history

See also
List of songs written by Bob Dylan
List of artists who have covered Bob Dylan songs

References

Glen Campbell albums
1965 debut albums
Bob Dylan tribute albums
Albums produced by Snuff Garrett
Instrumental albums
Jazz albums by American artists
Albums produced by Leon Russell
GNP Crescendo Records albums